The Hungary women's national softball team is the national team of the Hungary. It is governed by the Magyar Orszagos Baseball es Softball Szövetseg.

Results
 World Championship

 nc = not competed

 European Championship

 nc = not competed

 ESF Junior Girls Championship

 nc = not competed

References

External links
 Official National Federation website
 International Softball Federation

Softball
Women's national softball teams
Softball in Hungary